The following is a list of the 63 municipalities (comuni) of the Province of Belluno, Veneto, Italy.

List

See also 
List of municipalities of Italy

References 

Belluno